There are several groups named the Workers' Revolutionary Party:

Workers' Revolutionary Party (Argentina)
Workers Revolutionary Party (Greece)
Workers Revolutionary Party (India)
Workers' Revolutionary Party (Mexico)
Workers Revolutionary Party (Namibia)
Workers' Revolutionary Party (Nicaragua)
Workers' Revolutionary Party (Panama)
Workers' Revolutionary Party (Peru)
Workers' Revolutionary Party (Portugal)
Workers' Revolutionary Party (Spain)
Workers Revolutionary Party (UK)
Workers Revolutionary Party (Healy)
Workers Revolutionary Party (Internationalist)
Workers Revolutionary Party (Workers Press)

See also
Revolutionary Workers Party (disambiguation)

Political party disambiguation pages